The 1998 French Open was a tennis tournament that took place on the outdoor clay courts at the Stade Roland Garros in Paris, France. The tournament was held from 25 May until 7 June. It was the 102nd staging of the French Open, and the second Grand Slam tennis event of 1998.

Seniors

Men's singles

 Carlos Moyá defeated  Àlex Corretja, 6–3, 7–5, 6–3
• It was Moyá's 1st and only career Grand Slam singles title.

Women's singles

 Arantxa Sánchez Vicario defeated  Monica Seles, 7–6(7–5), 0–6, 6–2
• It was Sánchez's 4th and last career Grand Slam singles title and her 3rd title at the French Open.

Men's doubles

 Jacco Eltingh /  Paul Haarhuis defeated  Mark Knowles /  Daniel Nestor, 6–3, 3–6, 6–3
• It was Eltingh's 5th career Grand Slam doubles title and his 2nd and last title at the French Open.
• It was Haarhuis' 4th career Grand Slam doubles title and his 2nd title at the French Open.

Women's doubles

 Martina Hingis /  Jana Novotná defeated  Lindsay Davenport /  Natalia Zvereva, 6–1, 7–6(7–4)
• It was Hingis' 4th career Grand Slam doubles title and her 1st title at the French Open.
• It was Novotná's 10th career Grand Slam doubles title and her 3rd and last title at the French Open.

Mixed doubles

 Venus Williams /  Justin Gimelstob defeated  Serena Williams /  Luis Lobo, 6–4, 6–4
• It was Williams' 2nd and last career Grand Slam mixed doubles title and her 1st title at the French Open.
• It was Gimelstob's 2nd and last career Grand Slam mixed doubles title.

Juniors

Boys' singles
 Fernando González defeated  Juan Carlos Ferrero, 4–6, 6–4, 6–3

Girls' singles
 Nadia Petrova defeated  Jelena Dokić, 6–3, 6–3

Boys' doubles
 José de Armas /  Fernando González defeated  Juan Carlos Ferrero /  Feliciano López, 6–7, 7–5, 6–3

Girls' doubles
 Kim Clijsters /  Jelena Dokić defeated  Elena Dementieva /  Nadia Petrova, 6–4, 7–6

Notes

External links
 French Open official website

 
1998 in French tennis
1998 in Paris